{{automatic taxobox
| image = Amesiella monticola (Luzon, Philippines) Cootes & D.P.Banks, Orchids Austral. 10(5)- 26 (1998) (37797336464).jpg
| image_caption = Amesiella monticola
| display_parents = 3
| taxon = Amesiella
| authority = Schltr. ex Garay| type_species = Amesiella philippinensis| type_species_authority = (Ames) Garay 
| range_map = Map of Philippines.png
| range_map_caption = Distribution of Amesiella}}Amesiella is a genus of orchids endemic to the Island of Luzon, in the  Philippines. 

 Taxonomy 
Previously it was believed that the species of this genus belonged to the genus Angraecum within the subtribe Angraecinae.  The genus is named for Oakes Ames (1874-1950), founder of the orchid herbarium at Harvard University.

 Description 
These short-stemmed, miniature epiphytes form elliptic, coriaceous, distichous leaves. White flowers with pronounces spurs, indicating moth pollination, are formed on short, axillary racemes. 

Species
As of May 2014, three species were recognized:
 Amesiella minor  Senghas (1999)
 Amesiella monticola  Cootes & D.P.Banks (1998)
 Amesiella philippinensis''  (Ames) Garay  (1972)

References

External links 
 
 

 
Vandeae genera
Orchids of the Philippines
Taxonomy articles created by Polbot